Agnes Nagy (born 27 July 1992) is a Hungarian footballer who plays as a midfielder and has appeared for the Hungary women's national team.

Club career
Nagy played domestic football with MTK Hungária in the Női NB I.

In June 2016, Nagy joined Ferencváros. She also represented them in the 2016–17 UEFA Women's Champions League, playing three matches in the group qualifying round, in which she scored a goal against Konak Belediyespor.

Nagy re-joined MTK Hungária after a couple of seasons at Ferencváros.

International career
In 2016, Nagy represented Hungary during the Women's Euro 2017 qualifying stage, coming on as a substitute for Evelin Fenyvesi in the 89th minute.

In 2017, Nagy represented Hungary during the 2019 FIFA Women's World Cup qualifying cycle, coming on as a substitute for Zsófia Rácz in the 87th minute against Croatia.

Nagy was called-up to Hungary's initial squad for the 2018 Cyprus Women's Cup, but wasn't selected for the final squad.

References

External links
 
 
 

1992 births
Living people
Hungarian women's footballers
Hungary women's international footballers
Women's association football midfielders
MTK Hungária FC (women) players
Ferencvárosi TC (women) footballers